Henry Joseph Reilly (April 29, 1881 – December 13, 1963) was an American soldier and journalist. After seeing combat in World War I, Reilly helped found the Reserve Officers Association.

Early life and education 

Born in Fort Barrancas, Florida, Reilly was the son of an artillery officer. His father died in the 1900 Battle of Peking during the Chinese Boxer Rebellion, and his family moved to Winnetka, Illinois, soon afterward. Reilly graduated from the U.S. Military Academy in 1904.

Early career 
In the years leading up to World War I, Reilly served in Asia and Europe, and he also wrote a weekly military column for the Chicago Tribune.

Reilly resigned his commission on January 8, 1914.  He then served in British and French ambulance units.

When America entered the war in 1917, Reilly, by then a colonel, had assumed command of the 149th Field Artillery Regiment of the 42nd ("Rainbow") Division. His regiment saw combat in France, where it became known as "Reilly's Bucks."

He was awarded the Army Distinguished Service Medal in 1919. His citation reads, "Through his tireless energy and technical skill as an artillerist, his regiment gave most effective assistance to the Infantry which it supported."

Post-war life 

After the war, Reilly became a brigadier general in the Officer Reserve Corps and a well-known speaker, writer, journalist, and editor on military affairs. He served as a war correspondent, covering conflicts in Poland, Spain, Albania, and France. He edited the Army and Navy Journal from 1921 to 1925. He wrote several books, including Why Preparedness? (1916), based on what he had seen on Europe's eastern and western fronts in 1914 and 1915; America's Part (1926); and Americans All: History of the Rainbow Division (1936), which described the division's military actions, including stories about soldiers and officers from private to general.

In 1922, he helped found the Reserve Officers Association (ROA) and served as its first president. Today, the association has a scholarship named after him. The scholarship was suspended in April 2009 but has since returned to active use.

In 1938, Reilly was living near Paris; he visited Spain as an observer during its Civil War. 

Upon his death in 1963 he was buried in Arlington National Cemetery.

Awards
 Distinguished Service Medal
 Croix de Guerre with Palm
 Commander Legion of Honor
 Officier Ordre l'Etoile Noire

Selected publications
 America's Part. New York: Cosmopolitan Book Corp, 1928. 
 Americans All: The Rainbow at War: Official History of the 42nd Rainbow Division in the World War. Columbus, Ohio: F.J. Heer Print. Co, 1936. 
 Are Our Young Men to Have a Chance?: Blitzkrieg, Its Political and Economic Challenge. Civilian Military Education Fund, 1940. 
 The World War at a Glance: Essential Facts Concerning the Great Conflict between Democracy and Autocracy. Chicago: Laird & Lee, 1918.  
 Why Preparedness; The Observations of an American Army Officer in Europe, 1914-1915. Chicago: Daughaday and Company, 1916.

Legacy
Reilly amassed a large personal library, storing several hundred volumes and documents at ROA headquarters in Washington, D.C. ROA later gave most of the collection to the Pritzker Military Museum & Library in Chicago, Illinois, where it is a non-circulating named collection called the Henry J. Reilly Memorial Library.

References

Further reading
 Drew, George A. The Truth About the War Ottawa : MacLean's Magazine, 1928

External links
 
 "The Machine Gun Platoon: It Should be Retained as a Part of the Regimental Organization By Second Lieutenant Henry J Reilly Thirteenth Cavalry Commanding Machine Gun Platoon", an article in the Journal of the United States Cavalry Association, Volume 19 (1908).
 http://www.foreignaffairs.com/articles/69961/henry-j-reilly/blitzkrieg, an article in Foreign Affairs magazine, published in January 1940, by Reilly. He analyzes and explains the World War II German Blitzkrieg tatic.

1881 births
1963 deaths
Military personnel from Florida
United States Army generals
United States Military Academy alumni
United States Army personnel of World War I
American military writers
American military historians
American male non-fiction writers
American male journalists
Burials at Arlington National Cemetery